C.L.A.R.O is a political party in Orihuela, Spain.

External links
CLARO official website
Sunday Herald: Spanish Ayes
EUbusiness: Angry foreigners say not registered to vote in Spanish poll
 BBC News: Brits stand in Spanish elections: Political parties dominated by ex-pats, including many Britons, are campaigning in Spain's local elections.

Political parties in the Valencian Community